The 1957 Giro d'Italia was the 40th running of the Giro d'Italia, one of cycling's Grand Tour races. The Giro started in Milan, on 18 May, with a  stage and concluded in Milan, on 9 June, with a  leg. A total of 120 riders from 15 teams entered the 21-stage race, which was won by Italian Gastone Nencini of the Leo-Chlorodont team. The second and third places were taken by Frenchman Louison Bobet and Italian Ercole Baldini, respectively.

Teams

Fifteen teams were invited by the race organizers to participate in the 1957 edition of the Giro d'Italia. Each team sent a squad of ten riders, which meant that the race started with a peloton of 150 cyclists. From the riders that began the race, 86 made it to the finish in Milan.

The teams entering the race were:

Pre-race favorites

Reigning champion Charly Gaul was seen as a favorite to repeat as winner.

Route and stages
The route was revealed on 5 March 1957.

Classification leadership

One jersey was worn during the 1957 Giro d'Italia. The leader of the general classification – calculated by adding the stage finish times of each rider – wore a pink jersey. This classification is the most important of the race, and its winner is considered as the winner of the Giro.

The mountains classification leader. The climbs were ranked in first and second categories. In this ranking, points were won by reaching the summit of a climb ahead of other cyclists. There were two categories of mountains. The first category awarded 10, 7, 5, 3, and 1 points, while the second distributed 5, 3, and 1 points. Although no jersey was awarded, there was also one classification for the teams, in which the teams were awarded points for their rider's performance during the stages.

Final standings

General classification

Mountains classification

Intermediate sprints classification

Trofeo de Velodromos classification

Team classification

References

Citations

1957
1957 in Italian sport
1957 in road cycling
May 1957 sports events in Europe
June 1957 sports events in Europe
1957 Challenge Desgrange-Colombo